American actress and singer Alyssa Milano has recorded songs for four studio albums, two compilation albums, and an exercise video. She first came to prominence within the entertainment industry for her portrayal of Samantha Micelli in the television sitcom Who's the Boss?, which premiered in September 1984. While acting on the television series, she recorded and released music exclusively in Japan through the Japanese record label Pony Canyon, Inc. Pony Canyon, Inc. signed Milano to a five-album deal based on her appearance and personality, which was a common practice by Japanese record labels in their efforts to produce Japanese idols. The label also choose Milano due to her popularity in Asia from her role as Jenny Matrix in the 1985 film Commando. Throughout her musical career, Milano had little involvement with the songwriting and production of her albums. She did not express any interest in releasing her music in the United States, and said: "A lot of actors who release albums here are laughed at, I'm not interested in crossing over. I'd much rather have it released where it's appreciated than laughed at."

Prior to the release of her first album, Milano appeared in Japanese advertisements for pasta and chocolate milk; the jingles from the advertisements were written by producer Joey Carbone, and were later included on Milano's albums and released as singles. Milano's debut studio album Look in My Heart was released in March 1989, and peaked at number 68 on the Oricon Albums Chart. Milano's music incorporated prominent elements of bubblegum pop and dance-pop. Carbone was responsible for much of the album's songwriting and production, and Milano's father also contributed as co-writer of three songs. Prior to the release of her debut album, Milano released an exercise video, titled Alyssa Milano's Teen Steam, and recorded its theme song along with a rap. Milano's rap was written by producers Jason Hervey and Ryan Lambert. Milano's second studio album Alyssa was released later that year, peaked at number 15 on the Oricon Albums Chart and was certified platinum. A majority of the songwriters and producers from Look in My Heart handled the creation of its follow-up album, for which Milano earned her first songwriting credit as co-writer of "We Need the Children".

The following year, Milano released her first compilation album, The Best in the World: Non-Stop Special Remix/Alyssa's Singles, which included one new song, "The Best in the World". In 1991, Milano contributed to the charity single "Voices That Care" as one of the choir members. The record was followed by Milano's third studio album Locked Inside a Dream in May 1991. The album featured Milano singing and rapping about more mature subject matter. Milano again collaborated with her father and Carbone during its production. Production duo Jamey Jaz and Ren Toppano also served as songwriters and producers on the record, with their work being compared to the collaborations between Oliver Leiber and Paula Abdul. Milano's fourth studio album Do You See Me? was released in May 1992, and was the first record of hers not produced by Carbone. The album was described as having a more "mellow, sophisticated" style, and incorporating "slightly funkier twists" and "pop/hip-hop" sounds. Milano's final record was her second compilation album, The Very Best of Alyssa Milano, released in January 1995, which included one new song, "I Love When We're Together". In May 2013, Milano said that she had not returned to Japan since the end of her music career.

Songs

References

Milano, Alyssa
Songs